Kurt Zapf (16 August 1929 – 11 August 2010) was a German footballer.

Career 
He appeared in almost 250 East German top-flight matches from the mid-1950s to the mid-1960s.

Zapf also played in four matches for the East Germany national team in 1957 and 1958.

References

External links
 
 
 
 

1929 births
2010 deaths
East German footballers
East Germany international footballers
Association footballers not categorized by position